The Road Island Diner is a rare classic Streamline Moderne 60' x 16' Art Deco diner car restaurant located in the remote mountain city of Oakley, Utah in the United States. It was prefabricated as diner # 1107 in 1939 at the Elizabeth, New Jersey factory of the Jerry O'Mahony Diner Company.

After construction, it was displayed on exhibition at the 1939 World's Fair in New York. After the Fair, It was sold to Al McDermott who had it  towed it to Fall River, Massachusetts where it operated for 14 years. In 1953, it was sold to Greek immigrant Tommy Borodemos, who had it transported down the turnpike to Middletown, Rhode Island, where it operated for 4 generations as Tommy's Deluxe Diner. It closed in May 2006 and was purchased in 2007 by Utah businessman, Keith Walker, who transported it to Oakley, Utah. After a year of restoration, it was opened in July 2008. It is said to be the only pre-war, Art-deco streamline (constructed to mimic a rail dining car) diner west of the Mississippi River.

Claimed to have been the "Cadillac" of diner companies because of its steel frame construction, The Jerry O'Mahony Diner Company of Elizabeth, New Jersey whose motto was "In our line, We lead the world" was said to have produced 2,000 diners from 1917 to 1941 with only four pre-war Art-Deco streamline style diners to still be in operation.  The smaller 50' x 10' Mickey's Diner serial # 1067 in Saint Paul, Minnesota which is the first diner to be listed on the National Register of Historic Places, the 40' x 16' Collin's Diner serial # 1103 in  North Canaan, Ct. and the 1938 Summit Diner in Summit, N.J. The Road Island Diner (O'Mahony Dining Car #1107) was added to the National Register of Historic Places by the National Park Service on August 21, 2009.

See also
For other historic diners in the same architectural style see:
Mickey's Diner in St. Paul, Minnesota
Miss Albany Diner in Albany, New York
Village Diner in Red Hook, New York

References

Cramer, Alexander (July 7 2021). Oakley's Road Island Diner closes. Park Record. Retrieved 8/2/2022. https://www.parkrecord.com/news/summit-county/oakleys-road-island-diner-closes/

External links
Road Island Diner

Buildings and structures in Summit County, Utah
Commercial buildings on the National Register of Historic Places in Utah
Diners on the National Register of Historic Places
Diners in the United States
Streamline Moderne architecture in Utah
Tourist attractions in Summit County, Utah
National Register of Historic Places in Summit County, Utah